High Noon, also known as Nora Roberts' High Noon, is a 2009 television film directed by Peter Markle, which stars Emilie de Ravin and Ivan Sergei. The film is based on the 2007 Nora Roberts novel of the same name and is part of the Nora Roberts 2009 movie collection, which also includes  Northern Lights, Midnight Bayou, and Tribute. The film debuted April 4, 2009 on Lifetime Television.

Plot
Divorced crisis negotiator police lieutenant Phoebe MacNamara (de Ravin) struggles with the pressures of her job, raising her young daughter Carly, facing mounting bills, and taking care of her agoraphobic mother Essie (Shepard).

While talking down a distraught armed suicidal man threatening to jump from a rooftop, Phoebe meets his ex-boss, Duncan Swift (Sergei), who can't resist her take-charge attitude, not to mention her physical attractiveness. He attempts to earn her affections repeatedly, and though she tries to resist his charms, Phoebe soon realizes no amount of negotiation will keep Duncan at arm's length.  It's also not so bad when she finds out he won $138 million in a state lottery, and is a successful investor.

After being brutally attacked and handcuffed by an unknown assailant in the staircase of her precinct, Phoebe receives a series of mysterious and threatening messages. She soon learns she is the target of a psychopathic killer, an ex-SWAT cop, out to destroy her after the death of his fiancee in a bank robbery. He believes that her death is Phoebe's fault, as she was the negotiator working the incident.

Cast
 Emilie de Ravin as Lt. Phoebe McNamara
 Ivan Sergei as Duncan Swift
 Brian Markinson as Cpt. David McVee
 Ty Olsson as Dennis Walken
 Cybill Shepherd as Essie McNamara
 Olivia Cheng as Det. Liz Alberta
 Patrick Sabongui as Arnie Meeks
Savanna Carlson as Carly McNamara

Production
The film was executive produced by Stephanie Germain and Peter Guber, who also 'e.p.-ed' seven other Roberts films for Lifetime in 2007 and 2009.

References

External links
 
 

Lifetime (TV network) films
2009 television films
2009 films
2009 romantic drama films
American romantic drama films
Films based on American novels
Canadian romantic drama films
Films shot in British Columbia
English-language Canadian films
Films directed by Peter Markle
Canadian thriller television films
American drama television films
2000s American films
2000s Canadian films